Agidius may refer to:

 Cindy Agidius, American politician
 Aegidius Hunnius, Lutheran theologian
 Agidius Romanus, Medieval philosopher